The fifth and final season of Brothers & Sisters premiered on September 26, 2010, and concluded May 8, 2011. Season five takes place one year after the events of the season four finale "On the Road Again". This season featured the show's 100th episode with the airing of episode 13.

The show stars Sally Field, Dave Annable, Rachel Griffiths, Calista Flockhart, Matthew Rhys, Ron Rifkin, Patricia Wettig, Luke Macfarlane, and Gilles Marini.

The season was originally set to only feature 18 episodes to make way for new drama Off the Map in mid-season. However, on October 25, 2010, it was announced that ABC had picked up four more episodes, bringing the season to 22 episodes in total. The series' cancellation was announced on May 13, 2011.

Cast

There were several cast changes in 2011, with the departures of Rob Lowe, whose character Robert McCallister (Kitty's husband) died in the car crash that ended season 4, and of Luke Grimes, who played Ryan Lafferty, William Walker's illegitimate son. Gilles Marini, who played Luc Laurent, Sarah's boyfriend, was also been upgraded to a series regular. Additionally, Kerris Lilla Dorsey and Maxwell Perry Cotton, the actors who portrayed Sarah Walker's children, Paige and Cooper, respectively, were downgraded to recurring status.

ABC considered bringing back Balthazar Getty's character Tommy Walker full-time for the fifth season, but it was later announced that Getty would return for several episodes, the first of which would be the show's 100th episode. 

Emily VanCamp left the show and only appeared in two episodes during the fifth season to close out her character's storyline. Patricia Wettig left the show mid-season after her character Holly Harper followed her daughter to New York. This season sees the whole Harper family absent from the show.

Beau Bridges was cast as Nick Brody; Nora's high school flame. He signed on for at least five episodes and will first appear in the middle of the season. It was announced that Ida Holden (Marion Ross), mother of Saul and Nora, would die off-screen without appearing in any of the last season's episodes.

Main
Dave Annable as Justin Walker
Sally Field as Nora Walker
Calista Flockhart as Kitty Walker
Rachel Griffiths as Sarah Walker
Luke Macfarlane as Scotty Wandell
Gilles Marini as Luc Laurent
Matthew Rhys as Kevin Walker
Ron Rifkin as Saul Holden
Patricia Wettig as Holly Harper (episodes 1–12)

Recurring and notable guest stars
Sônia Braga as Gabriella Laurent, Luc's mother
Balthazar Getty as Tommy Walker
Emily VanCamp as Rebecca Harper
Kerris Dorsey as Paige Whedon
Maxwell Perry Cotton as Cooper Whedon
Cara Buono as Rose, Tommy's fiancée
Stephen Collins as Charlie
Jeremy Davidson as Jack Randall, Kitty's new love interest
Ken Olin as David Caplan
 Daniel and David Oshionebo as Evan Walker McCallister
Odette Yustman as Annie, Justin's new love interest
Ryan Devlin as Seth, a grad student at Kitty's college
Richard Chamberlain as Jonathan, Saul's ex-boyfriend
Rob Kazinsky as Rick, Annie's ex-boyfriend
John Terry as Karl West, Nora's new love interest
Beau Bridges as Nick Brody, Nora's former boyfriend 
Guillaume Dabinpons as Guillaume Dabinpons
 Isabella Rae Thomas as Olivia, Scotty and Kevin's adopted daughter
 Marika Dominczyk as Tyler Altamirano, Justin's former and new love interest

Storylines
This season picks up a year after the events of the previous season finale revealing what has happened since the events of "On The Road Again," such as whether Robert survived the car crash and how Saul is dealing with life after discovering he is HIV positive.

Nora
Nora begins the season secretly working as a florist as she feels she needs a new purpose in her life. Due to the events of the previous season, Nora hasn't been giving her opinions and advice to her family. After finally regaining her confidence, she quits her job and helps set straight her children, all of whom are going through various problems. A man witnessing this asks her to audition for a new radio show giving motherly advice. Although she is initially intimidated by competing against a well-known psychiatrist, Nora wins the show after Kevin and Kitty call in with their problems. After working at the radio station for a while, Nora begins dating a radio psychologist named Karl. Although they start off happy together, they eventually end their relationship after Karl finds it hard to deal with the rest of the Walkers and how close the family always seems to be. 

After Tommy's new partner Rose begins creating the Walker family tree, Nora begins to think back and feeling begin to resurface for her old flame Brody whom she left to marry William. Rose's information also makes Sarah temporarily question her paternity, so much so that she gets in contact with Brody who then turns up on Nora's doorstep. Although she is initially reluctant to speak to him she finds herself enjoying his company until she realises the reason she left him in the first place was because of his inability to commit. She realises he is still the same but that she doesn't blame him for that. Brody leaves again but asks Nora to take care of his dog, he returns a few weeks later, the same day that Nora discovers that her mother has died. Brody helps Nora deal with unresolved issues with her mother and she asks him to stay so that they can be together. After admitting to Justin that he lied about his blood type and therefore the possibility that he could be Sarah's father he decides to leave. Once Nora discovers this she and Justin carry out a secret paternity test and after it comes back positive decide to tell Sarah the truth, but after Sarah admits this doesn't change her feelings and wants to nothing to do with him Nora decides not to tell Brody. After Sarah discovers that Brody is her father he comes to win back Nora. At first she tries to stay away from him because of Sarah she can't help but give into her feelings for him. Although angry to begin with, on her wedding day Sarah connects with Brody and gives her parents her blessing. Nora ends the season looking over her new extended family happy with her life.

Kitty
Kitty begins the season refusing to leave the side of a comatose Robert, convinced he'll wake up, despite the rest of the family's doubts. She finally decides to say goodbye after encouragement from Justin. After this, she decides to rent a cottage in Ojai to rediscover herself.  She meets and begins to date a local man named Jack, who reveals he was once a corporate banker in the city and left for the same reasons she did. After she moves back to the city, Kitty is happy when Jack follows to be with her; however, it soon becomes clear that he isn't happy and they decide to end their relationship, acknowledging that they helped each other transition through difficult times in their lives.

Kitty begins teaching at Wexley University and meets a young graduate named Seth. Although hesitant at first, because he is only twenty-seven, Kitty begins dating Seth; however, their relationship becomes complicated when Kitty realizes Seth's mother is the dean of Wexley University and therefore Kitty's boss. Kitty ends her relationship with Seth when she goes to DC, under the pretense of business meetings. However, after following her there, Nora and Sarah discover that she has been seeing a specialist due to complications from her bone marrow transplant. She assures them that the treatment has worked and returns home with them to celebrate Evan's fourth birthday. Upon returning Kitty and Seth decide to give their relationship another try and take a trip to Boston together. However Kitty returns to support Sarah after discovering Brody is her real father and to help her plan her wedding. Later, it is revealed that Kitty is pregnant and she is very happy about it. But Nora and Seth are worried because of her previous experiences with cancer. In the end, it seems that Kitty has decided to continue with her pregnancy.

Kevin & Scotty
Since the end of the last season and their surrogacy plans falling through, Kevin has been distant from Scotty and has kept himself busy with work. Scotty admits to having a one-night stand with another man and Kevin begins sleeping on the sofa downstairs. Once the entire family discover what has happened, Kevin becomes angry but also admits that he wasn't there for Scotty when he needed him, thus he is partly to blame for what has happened to their marriage. Kevin decides to stay with Kitty for a while. Paige gets Kevin and Scotty to finally discuss what has been going on with their relationship and after talking they mend their relationship.  

The two then decide to try adoption, as they realise what they want most is to be parents, not to pass on their genes.  Subsequently, they begin spending time with a young girl, Olivia, in foster care and eventual officially adopt her. After spending time with her, Olivia begins to withdraw and they discover that she cannot read and was too afraid to tell them. They pay for her to have a tutor and eventually officially adopt her. She is introduced to the rest of the Walkers at Evan's birthday party where she begins to become close to her cousin Paige. After her older brother returns Kevin and Scotty must fight for their right to keep custody of Olivia. Although they are successful they ask her brother to dinner so that he can keep a close relationship with his sister. Scotty bumps into Michelle who is acting strangely and tries to talk to her after months of no contact. When he and Kevin see her at the airport with a baby they get the police involved realizing it is their child. Michelle calls Scotty and  tells him she wants to stay involved as his mother but when Kevin reminds her that she has no right or relation she gives back their son Daniel. Olivia has some trouble accepting Daniel into the family but in the end accepts her baby brother.

Sarah & Luc
Sarah is having trouble with Luc's busy and glamorous new career and begins to feel old around him; however, they become engaged at the end of episode five. After selling off the land discovered in the season four finale, Sarah decides to get back into business and uses her share of money to buy a large media company. She admits that part of her decision was that the company owns the radio station where Nora works, effectively making Sarah her boss. Sarah also has issues with Paige, as she continues to act out going as far as to drinking alcohol with her friend during a party for Luc. She is also becomes jealous of how much Paige and Coop look up to Luc and see him as a friend, although she later admits that to be a good parent she can't always be her children's friend.

After Tommy's fiance Rose digs into the Walker's family tree, she discovers that Nora and William lied about their wedding date because Nora was already pregnant with Sarah. Sarah begins to question her paternity and gets in contact with her mother's old flame Brody to discover the truth. After finding out that William is her father she and Nora ask Rose to stop digging into their past. When Brody returns, he admits to Justin that he lied about his blood type, he has the same one as William, meaning that he could also be Sarah's father. Brody makes Justin swear not to tell, but he eventually tells Nora. They sneak around, trying to get some of Sarah's DNA to test. They get the results which reveals that Brody is Sarah's biological father. Sarah doesn't want anything to do with Brody and still views William as her father. Sarah takes a walk before her wedding and discovers Brody sitting in his RV outside the church. They talk and Brody tells her that he was at her high school graduation and various other milestones in her life. Sarah asks Brody to walk her down the aisle. It is revealed that Brody has four other children, including Lori-Lynn who comes to Sarah's wedding unannounced.

Justin
Justin returns home to find Rebecca has moved out of their home and reveals to everyone that they had divorced while he was away. Although they spend another night together, Rebecca decides, after being offered a photography job in New York and problems with her mother, that it's time for her to move away, leaving Justin heartbroken. Justin is also the one to help Kitty move on and say goodbye to Robert. Later, after beginning work as a paramedic, Justin meets a nurse, Annie (played by Dave Annable's real-life wife, Odette Yustman) and they begin to date. Problems arise when Annie's ex-boyfriend, Dr. Rick, comes along and Justin becomes jealous. After a fight with Dr. Rick during the staff baseball game, Justin breaks up with her, telling her that he doesn't think she's over Dr. Rick.

Later Justin meets Zach, an ex-marine, living on the streets and takes it upon himself help him sort out his life by letting him stay in his house and getting him a job in Scotty's restaurant. It soon becomes clear after spending his time trying to help everyone else that Justin needs to focus on sorting out his own life and Zach moves out thanking Justin for what he has done. When he and Luc check bookings at a hotel for Luc's friends visiting for his bachelor party Justin bumps into his old love Tyler. Justin asks if she would like to meet up and although she is hesitant at first Tyler explains that she is married but separated. Justin opens up about his own divorce and the two share a kiss. He later begins to think their relationship is too complicated because Tyler's work colleagues think she is still happily married until she tells Justin that she wants to be with him.

Holly
Holly is revealed to have survived the car crash and now has a severe case of amnesia. When Nora drops by, Holly is suspicious of her, thinking William is still alive and doesn't remember their friendship. Holly cannot remember Rebecca, however, once she realizes she is her daughter, she tells her that although she now remembers her she does not feel anything towards her. This contributes to Rebecca's decision to move to New York. David wants to move back to New York to teach but Holly is unsure about leaving and worries that she will never be a real mother to Rebecca. After spending time with Nora, she realizes she has a chance to forget the past and begin a new life and so she leaves to be with David and Rebecca.

Saul
Saul deals with being HIV positive and coming to terms with how this affects his love life. Although he begins dating someone early in the season, this ends when he reveals his HIV status. Late, he begins dating a man named Johnathan. During Sarah's wedding, Saul's boyfriend asks him to marry him and he agrees. After his mother dies, he discovers that she knew he was gay and hoped he was happy leaving him with closure around their relationship.

Throughout the season, Saul also works with Scotty to open and run their restaurant Cafe 429.

Tommy
In the 100th episode, he returns with his fiancee Rose. Rose  digs into the Walker's family tree, and she discovers that Nora and William lied about their wedding date because Nora was already pregnant with Sarah. She brings up Brody, Nora's ex-boyfriend that she dated before William. It was because of her that Sarah questioned her paternity, so much so that Sarah got in contact with Brody who then turns up on Nora's doorstep. 

He left for Phoenix with Rose for a new job.

Episodes

Ratings

Notes

References

2010 American television seasons
2011 American television seasons